Diego Castellanos Sánchez (born March 14, 1993, in Guadalajara, Jalisco), known as Diego Castellanos, is a Mexican professional football player who plays as a forward.

External links
 

1993 births
Living people
Footballers from Guadalajara, Jalisco
Mexican footballers
Tampico Madero F.C. footballers
Alebrijes de Oaxaca players
Tuxtla F.C. footballers
Liga MX players
Association football forwards